Carl Els is a South African rugby union player for the  in the Currie Cup. His regular position is flanker.

Els was named in the team for the first round of Super Rugby Unlocked against , making his debut in the process.

References

South African rugby union players
Living people
Rugby union flankers
Griquas (rugby union) players
Year of birth missing (living people)